Venetia Newall (1935-2017) was an English-American folklorist who was elected president of the Folklore Society and fellow of the American Folklore Society.

Education 
Venetia Newall was born in London in 1935, to an American father and English mother. During the Second World War she stayed with her paternal grandfather in the United States. In 1953 she went to the University of St Andrews to read English Language and Literature. She would later gain a doctorate from the University for her work on Folklore.

Career 
Newall’s practical interest in Folklore developed from travels in central Europe with her husband.  In 1960, she observed peasant women selling elaborately decorated eggs at market stalls. Newall became a collector of such eggs, and explored customs surrounding them in her extensive study, An Egg at Easter (1971), which won the American Folklore Society's Chicago Folklore Prize in its year of publication.

A member of the British Folklore Society from the early 1960s, she served as Secretary of the Society from 1967 to 1980.  She was particularly noted for her networking skills, drawing in scholars from overseas to lecture at meetings of the Folklore Society.  During this period she also organized two large-scale events for the Society: the Anglo-American Folklore Conference at Ditchley Park in 1969 and the Folklore Society Centenary Conference at Royal Holloway College in 1978. Newall would serve as President of the Folklore Society from 1985 to 1987.

In the 1970s Newall became a research fellow at the School of Oriental and African Studies in London. She was later a visiting professor at Berkeley. Newall was an active editor of folklore publications: from 1973 to 1978, she was General Editor of The Folklore of the British Isles series of books published by Batsford and in 1981, she founded and edited the International Folklore Review, a journal which ran for eight years and contributed to the development of younger folklorists.

Selected works

References 

1935 births
2017 deaths
Presidents of the Folklore Society
20th-century English women writers
20th-century English writers
English folklorists
Women folklorists
English people of American descent
Writers from London
American folklorists
20th-century American writers
American people of English descent
Alumni of the University of St Andrews